Gippsland is a rural region that makes up the southeastern part of Victoria, Australia, mostly comprising the coastal plains to the rainward (southern) side of the Victorian Alps (the southernmost section of the Great Dividing Range). It covers an elongated area of  located further east of the Shire of Cardinia (Melbourne's outermost southeastern suburbs) between Dandenong Ranges and Mornington Peninsula, and is bounded to the north by the mountain ranges and plateaus/highlands of the High Country (which separate it from Hume region in Victoria's northeast), to the southwest by the Western Port Bay, to the south and east by the Bass Strait and the Tasman Sea, and to the east and northeast by the Black-Allan Line (the easternmost section of the Victoria/New South Wales state border).

The Gippsland region is generally divided by the Strzelecki Ranges and tributaries of the Gippsland Lakes into five statistical sub-regions — namely the West Gippsland, South Gippsland, Latrobe Valley, Central Gippsland and East Gippsland. Gippsland is best known for its primary production such as mining, power generation and farming as well as its tourist destinations — Phillip Island, Wilsons Promontory, the Gippsland Lakes, Walhalla, the Baw Baw Plateau, and the Strzelecki Ranges.

History
The traditional owners are Indigenous Australians of the Gunai nation and in part of West Gippsland the Bunurong nation. Before permanent European colonisation, the area was visited by sealers and wattle bark gatherers who did not settle. Samuel Anderson (1803-1863), a Scottish immigrant from Kirkcudbright, agriculturist and explorer, arrived in Hobart, Tasmania, in 1830, and in 1835 established a squatter agricultural settlement on the Bass River in Gippsland, the third permanent colonial settlement in Victoria (then called the Port Phillip District). His business partner Robert Massie joined him in 1837. Both had worked for the Van Diemen's Land Company at Circular Head, Tasmania. Samuel's brothers Hugh (1808-1898) and Thomas (1814-1903) arrived at Bass shortly after, where they established a successful farming venture.

Further European colonisation followed two separate expeditions to the area.
 
During his expedition to the South (December 1839 - May 1840) in March 1840, Polish explorer Paweł Edmund Strzelecki led an expedition across Gunai country, and gave his own names to many of their natural landmarks and places. Following these expeditions, the name "Gippsland" stuck, a name chosen by Strzelecki in honour of the New South Wales Governor, George Gipps, his sponsor.
See also Count Strzelecki - a magic name in Gippsland

Angus McMillan led the second European expedition between 1840, naming Gunai country "Caledonia Australis".
The naming of this geographical region, however, remained the name given by P. E. Strzelecki - Gippsland

The township of Bass was surveyed and colonised in the early 1860s.

The intensive colonisation of south Gippsland began late in the 1870s. A story of that process is told in, The land of the Lyre Bird (1920).

Gippsland will serve as one of the hosts for the 2026 Commonwealth Games in regional Victoria.

Geography

Gippsland is traditionally subdivided into four or five main subregions or districts:
West Gippsland (roughly equivalent to the Baw Baw Shire)
South Gippsland (Bass Coast and South Gippsland Shires)
the Latrobe Valley (Latrobe City and areas of Baw Baw to the north)
East Gippsland (Shires of Wellington and East Gippsland).
Sometimes a fifth region, Central Gippsland (corresponding approximately to the Shire of Wellington), is added to refer to the drier zone between the Gippsland Lakes and Yarram.

Gippsland Plains Grassy Woodland is an endangered vegetation community within the region.

Climate

Natural resources

The soils in Gippsland are generally very infertile, being profoundly deficient in nitrogen, phosphorus, potassium and calcium. Apart from frequently flooded areas, they are classed as Spodosols, Psamments and Ultisols. Consequently, heavy fertilisation is required for agriculture or pastoral development. Despite this, parts of Gippsland have become highly productive dairying and vegetable-growing regions: the region supplies Melbourne with most of its needs in these commodities. A few alluvial soils (chiefly near the Snowy) have much better native fertility, and these have always been intensively cultivated. In the extreme northeast is a small section of the Monaro Tableland used for grazing beef cattle.

Gippsland possesses very few deposits of metallic minerals (gold rushes in the nineteenth century around Foster, Buchan petered out quickly). However, the deep underground gold mines operated at Walhalla for a fifty-year period between 1863 and 1913. Gippsland has no deposits of major industrial nonmetallic minerals, but it does feature the world's largest brown coal deposits and, around Sale and offshore in the Bass Strait, some of the largest deposits of oil and natural gas in Australia.

Like the rest of Australia, the seas around Gippsland are of very low productivity as there is no upwelling due to the warm currents in the Tasman Sea. Nonetheless, towns such as Marlo and Mallacoota depended for a long time on the fishing of abalone, whose shells could fetch very high prices because of their use for pearls and pearl inlays.

Administration

Political representation 
For Australian federal elections for the House of Representatives, the electoral divisions of Flinders, Monash, and Gippsland lay entirely or partly in the Gippsland region. Flinders and McMillan are currently held by the Liberal Party, while Gippsland is held by the Nationals.

For elections for the Victorian Legislative Assembly, the electoral districts of Bass, Narracan, Morwell, Gippsland South and Gippsland East lay entirely or partly in the Gippsland region. Bass is held by Labor, Narracan is held by the Liberals while Gippsland East and Gippsland South are held by the Nationals. The remaining seat, Morwell, is held by Russell Northe, an independent who was originally elected as a Nationals MP.

Local government areas 
Gippsland contains six local government areas:

Environmental protection 
The Gippsland region contains the Alfred National Park, Baw Baw National Park, Coopracambra National Park, Croajingolong National Park, Errinundra National Park, Gippsland Lakes Coastal Park, Lind National Park, Mitchell River National Park, Morwell National Park, Snowy River National Park, Tarra-Bulga National Park, The Lakes National Park, and Wilsons Promontory National Park.

There are also large areas of State forest that contribute towards conservation objectives.

Notable people
 

Ricky Megee (born 1970/1971), outback survivor

See also

Geography of Victoria
Regions of Victoria
Giant Gippsland earthworm
Gippsland massacres
White woman of Gippsland
Old Gippstown
Gippsland Art Gallery

Notes

References